Paul Lieber is an American film, television and theatre actor. He is perhaps best known for playing the role of Det. Sgt. Eric Dorsey on three episodes of the American sitcom television series Barney Miller.

Lieber guest-starred in television programs including Barney Miller, Who's the Boss?, Cagney & Lacey, Murder, She Wrote, Night Court, Silver Spoons, Law & Order, Monk, Jake and the Fatman, The X-Files, Judging Amy and Curb Your Enthusiasm. He also performed in two Broadway plays, And Miss Reardon Drinks a Little and Lenny.

References

External links 

Year of birth missing (living people)
Place of birth missing (living people)
Living people
American male stage actors
American male film actors
American male television actors
20th-century American male actors
21st-century American male actors
American theatre people